8 Bishopsgate is a 51-story, 204-meter (669 ft) commercial skyscraper located in the City of London, London's most prominent financial district. On completion, it will be the 10th-tallest building in London and the United Kingdom. The building is situated on the corner of Bishopsgate and Leadenhall Street, where it neighbours 122 Leadenhall Street and 22 Bishopsgate, two taller skyscrapers also constructed as part of a recent wave of high-rise development in the Bishopsgate area, caused by growing demand for office space in the City of London.

The skyscraper was designed to be ‘visually striking’ incorporating high-quality warm building materials such as wood and marble to welcome visitors inside.

Demolition work on the previous buildings began in mid-2018, with construction work beginning on the new building in 2019. It is estimated that the skyscraper will open in 2023.

Site history

Previous building 
 The new skyscraper replaced 6–8 Bishopsgate, a 79-meter (260 ft) office building that was the headquarters of Barings Bank up until its collapse in 1995.  Barings Bank had been based at 8 Bishopsgate since 1806, the building undergoing several expansions and refurbishments up until it was replaced by a high-rise. Designed by GMW Architects, construction started in 1977 and took four years. The building opened in 1981 and was in use until 2019.

Planning 

The original contested scheme for 8 Bishopsgate was submitted in 2015.

Sustainability 

8 Bishopsgate is one of the most sustainable skyscrapers in London, having gained multiple credentials and developed several solutions to maintain the building efficiently and ecologically. The building was given an EPC (Energy Performance Certificate) rating of 'A', as well as being the tallest structure in the UK to achieve a BREEAM (Building Research Establishment Environmental Assessment Method) 'Outstanding' rating. The skyscraper has the highest solar panels in London and features low embodied carbon as well as being low-carbon in operation.

Methods 
The building incorporates a multitude of methods with the help of modern technology, such as recycling rejected heat from cooling systems, helping it meet 60% of its annual heat demand. Rainwater is harvested from the building, to be filtered and reused for irrigation of its gardens and for toilet flushing, helping to reduce the overall water consumption. highly energy-efficient facades include light-responsive blinds that allow in daylight while controlling glare and reducing cooling demands by 5%. In addition, lights in the building are fitted with occupancy sensors, which contributes to saving on electricity.

Carbon efficiency 

The engineers of 8 Bishopsgate, Arup, used advanced analytical modeling to aid the design process. The optimised design avoided an extra 300 tonnes of CO2. In total 5,440 tonnes of CO2 were saved during the project.

Gallery

See also

 City of London landmarks
 List of tallest buildings and structures in London

References 

London